fr·ee is a global architecture and industrial design firm founded by Fernando Romero with offices in New York, Mexico City, Madrid and Shenzhen.

An active agent in the reconfiguration of site and public space, fr·ee’s commitment to translating historic, social, economic and environ- mental contexts into contemporary urban destinations has garnered critical attention and attracted millions of visitors, generating positive impact in cities and communities. Over the past 20 years, fr·ee has realized and proposed projects in a number of countries that en- compass different programs and contexts, from museums and office buildings to dense urban centers and the desert.

Notable projects

Soumaya Museum 
The Museo Soumaya is home to an art collection of nearly 70,000 works, dating from the 15th to mid-20th century, including the second largest collection of Auguste Rodin sculptures. Rising 150 feet at the heart of a new cultural and commercial district, Plaza Carso, the building’s form, a rotated rhomboid supported by 28 curved steel columns of varying size and shapes, is clad in a skin of 16,000 hexagonal mirrored-steel elements. These reference the traditional, colonial ceramic-tiled building facades in Mexico City, and give the Museo Soumaya a different appearance depending on the weather, time of day and the viewer’s vantage point.

Bridging Teahouse 
Bridging Teahouse is one of the 17 pavilions of Jinhua Architecture Park, located in the new Jindong District—an area masterplanned by Herzog & de Meuron in 2003. The park, designed by world-renowned Chinese artist Ai Weiwei, is set by the city’s Yiwu River on a strip of land some 2 km / 1.25 mile long and dedicated to the memory of his father, the poet Ai Qing. Together, the pavilions form an important part of the new district’s development and create attractions for a range of people.

G20 Convention Center 
A world-class Convention Center in Los Cabos, Mexico, to host the annual G20 Economic Summit in 2012. On that occasion the leaders of the world’s largest economies, including US’ President Barack Obama, Russian President Vladimir Putin, and German Chancellor Angela Merkel took important steps to ensure strong, sustainable and balanced global growth. Located beside a private golf community with views of the surrounding desert landscape to one side and the Gulf of California to the other, the Los Cabos International Convention Center has a capacity of up to 6,500 people. To accommodate a variety of uses during G20 and future conventions, festivals and events, FR-EE’s flexible design offers areas for exhibitions and conventions, multi-modal parking, a service mezzanine and other facilities for visitors.

Mexico New International Airport (NAICM) 
Designed in collaboration with Foster and Partners, Mexico City’s New International Airport will revolutionize airport design and the experience of traveling. It creates an infrastructure that will last for the entire 21st century and become an icon for Mexico. This “Airport of the Future” is designed with inspiration from the past. The shape, the symbolism, the sheer monumentality of the building are all drawn from Mexican art and architecture. Commissioned by the Federal Government of Mexico, it is the largest new infrastructural project in Latin America. It will be the most sustainable airport in the world and revolutionize airport design. It has been awarded the AEC Excellence in Infrastructure prize by Autodesk for the BIM Model in 2017, and in 2021 with Rethink the Future Award, in the category Concept and Transportation.

Hyperloop Altiplano 
]
As the first new major mode of transportation in over 100 years, carrying passengers and cargo directly to their destinations at speeds of up to 700 mph, above land or underground, and point-to-point without stops, the system promises to enhance Mexico’s global transport and logistics performance, and secure the country a position as a leader in autonomous mobility and other innovative transportation-related research. With the recent and successful completion of its Proof of Concept, the stage is now set for proof of operations testing in 2020 with new corridors coming online in subsequent years, including ones in Mexico.

Border City - FR-EE City 
FR-EE City is an urban prototype for building new cities in the emerging economies of the 21st century. Imagine a city where people in developing countries are able to contribute to society and enjoy the liberties of urban life in a holistic economy. Envision a place where residents are guaranteed security, healthcare and education, a city where access to information is unrestricted and innovative technologies are fully integrated into everyday life. What if policy-making was determined by factual data and not political disputes? Cities must embrace these types of opportunities and help redefine the way we live today.

Publications 
 Fernando Romero: FR-EE Architecture, 2019 by Rizzoli
 Simplexity, 2013 by Hatje Cantz
FR-EE, 2013 by Mapas
Fernando Romero: 2000 - 2010, 2009 by LAR/Fernando Romero
Hyperborder, 2007 by Princeton Architectural Press
ZMVM, 2000 by LAR

Awards 
 2021: Rethink The Future Award but RTF for NAICM.
2020: Merit Award by CRED for Plaza Carso. 
2017: World Changing Ideas Award by Fast Company 
 2015: American Institute of Architects, Honorary Fellowship
 2015: Architizer A+ Award for Soumaya Museum
 2013: Azure Magazine People's Choice Award for Soumaya Museum
 2012: 50 Most Influential Designers by Fast Company

References

External links 
 
FR-EE Press
 Dezeen archives for fr·ee
 032c interview

Architecture firms of Mexico
Design companies established in 2000
Mexican companies established in 2000
Companies based in Mexico City